o-Nitroanisole is an organic compound with the formula CH3OC6H4NO2.  Three isomers of nitroanisole exist, but the o-isomer is the most commercially important.  It is a colorless liquid. 

It is prepared by treatment of o-chloronitrobenzene with sodium methoxide:
NaOCH3  +  ClC6H4NO2  →   CH3OC6H4NO2  +  NaCl
The resulting 2-chloronitrobenzene can reduced to o-anisidine, which is a precursor to dyes.

References

Nitrobenzenes